Aarón Moisés Cruz Esquivel (born 25 May 1991) is a Costa Rican professional football player who plays as a goalkeeper currently playing for Deportivo Saprissa.

Biography

Aarón Cruz was born on 25 May 1991.

Club career

A. D. San Carlos

Cruz made his professional debut on 22 January 2011, on the third day of the Summer Championship against Barrio México, as a local. On that occasion, he started the 90 minutes in the 2–1 victory. In all the competition he had two participations and in most of the times he was waiting from the substitution. On the other hand, the Sancarleños advanced to the eliminatory stage after finishing in second place in group B. In the quarterfinals they defeated Cartaginés, then in the semifinals they defeated Deportivo Saprissa, and were defeated in the finals against Alajuelense, obtaining the title runner-up.

At the 2011 Winter Championships, Cruz made 7 appearances, while his team finished in eighth place with 21 points. In Summer 2012 he only saw action for one game. On 19 January 2011, Cruaz he unexpectedly announced his retirement at age 20, to devote more time to his PE career.

On 14 January 2015, the team issued a press release and made Cruz's return official for the Closing Tournament in the Costa Rican Second Division. He appeared as a substitute on 21 January for matchday 3 in the visit to Generación Saprissa, the match that concluded tied at a goal. After waiting on the bench, he started on 8 April in the match that faced CD Liberia at the Carlos Ugalde Stadium. Cruz conceded a goal in the 0–1 defeat. At the end of the days, his group was in ninth place in group A, with 17 points and a long way from qualifying for the next round.

Pérez Zeledón

In mid-2015, Cruz signed with Pérez Zeledón, returning to the top flight. However, he never made his Winter Championship debut. Added to this, his team went through a performance crisis that was forced to separate several players, including Cruz himself. The other dismissed were Pedro Leal, Daniel Ramírez, Cristian Bermúdez, and Julián Pino.

C. F. Universidad de Costa Rica

During the transfer period, Cruz signed by C.D. Universidad de Costa Rica to face the 2015 Winter tournament. He began as an academic on 25 October, in the match against Carmelita, at the Ecological Stadium. He started the 90 minutes in the 1–0 win. In total, he made 7 apperrances and his club was seventh with 27 points.

In the 2016 Summer Championship, Cruz acquired regularity in the starting lineups of the Portuguese coach Guilherme Farinha. He was for 21 games and conceded 29 goals. On the other hand, the university students finished in sixth place with 32 points.

Cruz missed the first round of the 2016 Winter Championship due to a broken finger. He returned on 21 September in the game against Deportivo Saprissa, and the score was a 4–0 in a defeat. In all the competition, he played 7 matches with 664 minutes of participation.

Deportivo Saprissa

On 20 December 2016, Deportivo Saprissa announced, through a press release, the incorporation of Cruz into the purple team. He signed the contract for a period of three and a half years.

Cruz as the starter on the first date of the Apertura 2017. For the start of the 2017 Summer Championship that took place on 8 January, the Saprissista team had a visit to the Carlos Ugalde Stadium, where they faced San Carlos. On his side, Cruz made his official debut with the number "22" and conceded a goal in the 1–0 defeat. The resumption of the Concacaf Champions League, in the first leg of the quarterfinals, took place on 21 February, the date on which his club hosted Pachuca de México at the Ricardo Saprissa Stadium. He was left as a substitute and the process of the match was consumed in a draw without annotations. On 28 February was the second leg of the continental tournament, at the Hidalgo Stadium. The final score was 4–0 in favor of the Tuzos. On 12 April, in the rough game against Pérez Zeledón at the Ricardo Saprissa Stadium, his club was behind on the scoreboard due to the opponent's goal in just four minutes after starting the second half. The defensive block of the generals closed the spaces to the purple ones to deploy the offensive system of coach Carlos Watson, but at the 85th minute, his teammate, Daniel Colindres gave a filtered pass to the Uruguayan player Fabrizio Ronchetti for him to define with a leg shot left. Shortly before the end of the supplementary stage, defender Dave Myrie scored the winning goal 2–1. With this result, the Saprissistas secured the lead of the tournament in the absence of a qualifying round commitment. With a 1–2 loss at home against Santos de Guápiles, his team reached third place in the home run and therefore was established in the last instance by not having obtained the first place again. On 17 May, the first leg of the final against Herediano took place at the Rosabal Cordero Stadium. The goalkeeper saw no action in the 3–0 loss. In the return match on 21 May at the Ricardo Saprissa Stadium, the events that ended the tournament were a failure with a score of 0–2 in favor of the opponents, and an aggregate of 0–5 in the aggregate series.

His debut in the 2017 Apertura Tournament took place on July 30 at the "Fello" Meza de Cartago Stadium, where his team played at home against Carmelita. Cruz, for his part, appeared in the starting eleven, completed all the minutes and conceded two goals in the victory with the score of 4–2. The Saprissistas advanced to the home run in second place with 43 points, and at the end of it, the Tibaseño team was left without possibilities of opting for the title. Cruz counted eight appearances, executed nineteen interventions and managed to keep the goal at zero on one occasion.

With a view to the 2018 Closing Tournament, his team changed coaches due to the retirement of Carlos Watson, with Vladimir Quesada- who was the assistant last season, became the new coach of the club. Cruz appeared as a starter for the 90 minutes in the 0–3 victory over Liberia at the Edgardo Baltodano Stadium, where he had a relatively quiet game in his goal which kept him undefeated. On 20 May, he was proclaimed champion of the tournament with his club after beating Herediano in the penalty shootout. Cruz made 15 appearances, intervened 27 times and left his goal unbeaten 5 times. At the conclusion of the 2018 Apertura competition, he made a total of three appearances in which he did not receive any goals.

He faced his first match of the 2019 Clausura Tournament on 3 January, reaching all the minutes in the home draw at two goals against Limón. On 15 May, he obtained the runner-up of the contest.

He begins the 2019 Opening Tournament with the defeat of his team 1–0 against San Carlos, in which Cruz started.

On 28 July, he was sent off in the match against Santos de Guápiles, after having intercepted with his hands in a clear play of goal outside the area, for which he received a two-game suspension. On 26 November, he was proclaimed champion of the 2019 Concacaf League, after defeating Motagua from Honduras in the final.

He played the first date of the 2020 Closing Tournament on January 11 against San Carlos at the Carlos Ugalde Stadium. Cruz reached all the minutes and left the fence undefeated in the 1–0 win. In the competition he was the most regular player on the team with 23 appearances. On 29 June, he achieved the national title with Saprissa, after overcoming the final series of the championship over Alajuelense. On 7 July, Cruz signed his renewal contract until May 2023.

The new season began on 15 August 2020, for the first date of the Opening Tournament with a 4–0 home victory over Limón. In this competition he was the immovable goalkeeper and had 18 appearances.

He makes his debut on the first day of the 2021 Closing Tournament on 13 January, as a starter in the goalless draw against Municipal Grecia. On 21 February, he suffered a muscle tear and was out for two to three weeks. On 9 March, he was allowed to play after his recovery. His team entered the semifinals of the tournament in fourth place. On 16 May, he was the hero in stopping a penalty shot from Bryan Ruiz, for the first leg, and three days later he stopped a shot at Ruiz himself. The purple team made it to the final after defeating Alajuelense with a 5–6 aggregate. On 23 May, he started in the first leg of the final against Herediano, and also on May 26 in the second leg, where he was proclaimed champion by winning the series. Cruz had saved most penalties in the championship, reaching the tally of four. On 17 June 17, he was awarded the prize for the best goalkeeper of the contest.

International career

Youth career

On 23 November 2010, Cruz participated in the 2011 CONCACAF Under-20 Championship qualification held in Guatemala. The first match took place against Nicaragua, which ended 4–0 in favor of the Costa Ricans. Later they faced Panama, but the scoreboard ended with a 1–0 defeat. The Costa Rican team obtained second place in the table and played the playoffs against El Salvador. The round-trip games ended 1–0 and 1–1, with the victory of the Salvadorans, but due to FIFA regulatory issues they were disqualified by fielding a player who was ineligible to represent that country. Therefore, the Costa Rican squad won the series with score of 3–0 in both games, and subsequently qualified for the regional tournament.

The Costa Rican U20 team participated at the 2011 FIFA U-20 World Cup in Colombia, was place with Spain, Australia and Ecuador. The match between Costa Rica and Spain ended in a 1–4 win. On 3 August the match against the Australians was played, and  Cruz was in the substitution and the result finished 2–3 in favor of the Sele. The last game of the group stage was against the Ecuadorians; the goalkeeper again waited from the bench in the 3–0 loss. With this performance obtained, the Costa Rican squad advanced to the next stage among the best third parties. At the Nemesio Camacho El Campín Stadium in Bogotá, the game for the round of 16 against host Colombia took place on August 9. Cruz started and the score ended 3–2 in favor of the Colombians, leaving his country eliminated.

Senior team

On 14 March 2019, the player receives his first call up to the senior team by Gustavo Matosas, to face a couple of friendly matches of the month. On 24 March 23, a day after the game against Guatemala, Cruz was left on the bench, with a muscle injury that was confirmed in training that prevented him from continuing to concentrate. His place was taken over by Marco Madrigal.

On 23 January 2020, Cruz returns to the roster this time by Rónald González Brenes, with the purpose of making a blank on a non-FIFA date.

On 1 February, in a match against the United States at Dignity Health Sports Park. Cruz remained in the substitution and his country lost by the minimum 1–0.

On 9 May 2021, he was named in the preliminary squad to participate in the 2021 CONCACAF Nations League Finals. He was included in the final-23 of 25 May. However, Cruz was tested positive for COVID-19, and was replaced by Patrick Sequeira on 27 May.

References

1991 births
Living people
Costa Rican footballers
Association football goalkeepers
Deportivo Saprissa players
Costa Rica international footballers